Wellington Nogueira Lopes de Avellar, or simply Lopes Tigrão (born June 1, 1979 in Volta Redonda), is a Brazilian football player. He won the top scorer of Copa Libertadores in 2001, scoring 9 goals.

Lopes has played for Palmeiras, Santos, Juventude and Cruzeiro, Atlético and Ceará in the Campeonato Brasileiro. He has also played for Vegalta Sendai and Yokohama F. Marinos of J1 League.

Club statistics

Honors

Volta Redonda
 Copa Rio: 1
 1999
Palmeiras
 Copa dos Campeões: 1
 2000

Individual
Copa Libertadores Top Scorer : 2001

References

External links

1979 births
People from Volta Redonda
Living people
Brazilian footballers
Brazilian expatriate footballers
Expatriate footballers in Japan
Campeonato Brasileiro Série A players
Campeonato Brasileiro Série B players
J1 League players
J2 League players
Campeonato Brasileiro Série D players
Volta Redonda FC players
Sociedade Esportiva Palmeiras players
CR Flamengo footballers
Fluminense FC players
Santos FC players
Esporte Clube Juventude players
Cruzeiro Esporte Clube players
Vegalta Sendai players
Yokohama F. Marinos players
Clube Atlético Mineiro players
Ceará Sporting Club players
Clube Atlético Metropolitano players
São José Esporte Clube players
Brasiliense Futebol Clube players
Association football forwards
Sportspeople from Rio de Janeiro (state)